"Here I Am (Come and Take Me)" is a 1973 song by Al Green, the second single released from his album Call Me. The song reached number 10 on the Billboard Hot 100 and number two on the Hot Soul Singles chart. It was certified as a gold record by the Recording Industry Association of America.

Composition and recording
Green wrote "Here I Am (Come and Take Me)" with Teenie Hodges, with whom he also collaborated in writing "Take Me to the River," "Love and Happiness," "Full of Fire," and other songs. It was produced by Willie Mitchell in the 1972 recording session for the album Call Me.

Chart performance
Hi Records released the song as a single in June 1973, with "I'm Glad You're Mine" on the B-side. It was the second single from Call Me, after the title track. The record reached number 10 on the US  Billboard Hot 100 and received a gold certification, having sold more than 500,000 copies.

Weekly charts

Year-end charts

Certifications

UB40 version

In 1990, British reggae-pop band UB40 released "Here I Am (Come and Take Me)" as the second single from their ninth studio album, Labour of Love II. It reached only number 46 in the United Kingdom, but proved to be much more successful elsewhere, especially in Australasia. It peaked at number three in Australia, number six in New Zealand, and number seven on the  US Billboard Hot 100 in July 1991. In Australia, it placed at number 24 on the 1991 year-end chart, while in the United States, it was ranked number 72 on the 1991 year-end chart.

Charts

Weekly charts

Year-end charts

Certifications

Other cover versions
The song has also been covered by such performers as Michael Jackson, Etta James, and Seal. Several reggae versions have been recorded, including by Marcia Griffiths, Pluto Shervington, Owen Gray, and Inner Circle.

References

1973 singles
1973 songs
1990 singles
Al Green songs
Hi Records singles
Virgin Records singles
Song recordings produced by Willie Mitchell (musician)
Songs written by Al Green
Songs written by Teenie Hodges
UB40 songs